Arlette Conquers Paris (German: Arlette erobert Paris) is a 1953 West German comedy film directed by Viktor Tourjansky and starring Johanna Matz, Karlheinz Böhm and Claus Biederstaedt. It was shot at the Babelsberg Studios and on location in Paris. The film's sets were designed by the art directors Franz Bi and Bruno Monden.

Cast
 Johanna Matz as Arlette
 Renée Franke as Arlette's singing voice
 Paul Dahlke as Justizminister
 Karlheinz Böhm as Gérard Laurent
 Peer Schmidt as Luc Lamballe
 Claus Biederstaedt as Student Marc Tissier
 Werner Lieven as M. Boiret
 Erni Mangold as Mariilou Bergeret
 Gert Fröbe as Manager Edmond Duval
 Rudolf Vogel as Kunsthändler Jean Maurot
 Kurt Großkurth as Kommissar
 Lina Carstens as Concierge Frau Pézat  
 Paula Menari as La Putzfrau  
 Alfred Menhardt as Kunsthändler Jean Pommart 
 Ulrich Bettac 
 Doris Kirchner 
 Arnulf Schröder

References

Bibliography 
 Bock, Hans-Michael & Bergfelder, Tim. The Concise CineGraph. Encyclopedia of German Cinema. Berghahn Books, 2009.

External links 
 

1953 films
1953 comedy films
German comedy films
West German films
1950s German-language films
Films directed by Victor Tourjansky
Films set in Paris
German black-and-white films
1950s French films
1950s German films
Films shot at Bavaria Studios
Films shot in Paris